Cargoitalia S.p.A. was a cargo airline with its head office in the Avioport Logistics Park in Lonate Pozzolo, Province of Varese, Italy, near Milan. The airline had its registered office in Milan. It operated all-cargo scheduled and charter services from Italy to the Middle East, the Far East and North America. Its main base was Malpensa Airport.

History 
The airline was established in 2005 and is the first cargo airline to operate from Italy with private Italian capital.

As of December 2008, Alis Aerolinee Italiane has acquired Cargoitalia to get the air operator certificate of the financially struggling cargo carrier.  The AOC is a prerequisite for its bid for the cargo division of Alitalia that CAI is not interested in.  Cargoitalia has since replaced its operations with its single DC-10-30F freighter and has laid off the majority of its staff.

In May 2009, the airline restarted operations with a single McDonnell Douglas MD-11F.

On 21 December 2011, the airline ceased operations again.

Destinations 
Cargoitalia connected the following destinations at July 2011:

Shanghai - Pudong International Airport

Hong Kong International Airport

Krasnoyarsk - Yemelyanovo Airport

Dubai - Dubai International Airport
Sharjah - Sharjah International Airport

Chicago - O'Hare International Airport
New York City - John F. Kennedy International Airport

Fleet
The Cargoitalia fleet included the following aircraft (as of July 2011):

See also
 List of defunct airlines of Italy

References

External links

Italian companies established in 2005
Italian companies disestablished in 2011
Defunct airlines of Italy
Airlines established in 2005
Airlines disestablished in 2011
Cargo airlines